Christian Brückner is a German voice actor and actor.

Brückner provides the German voice-dubbing for such actors as Gary Oldman, Robert De Niro, Robert Redford, Martin Sheen, Harvey Keitel, Burt Reynolds, Dennis Hopper, Gérard Depardieu, Donald Sutherland, and Jon Voight.

In 2009, he appeared with a small German-speaking part in the film Inglourious Basterds by Quentin Tarantino.

He has also collaborated with the German trance/techno band E Nomine on a number of their albums.

External links
 
 The song "Earlkings legacy", performed by Christian Brückner, was produced by BAD-EGGZ in 2002.

Year of birth missing (living people)
Living people
People from Wałbrzych
People from the Province of Silesia
German male voice actors
Officers Crosses of the Order of Merit of the Federal Republic of Germany